NGC 399 is a barred spiral galaxy located in the constellation Pisces. It was discovered on October 7, 1874 by Lawrence Parsons. It was described by Dreyer as "very faint, small, round."

References

External links
 

0399
18741007
Pisces (constellation)
Barred spiral galaxies
004096